4th Rifle Division can refer to:

4th Guards Rifle Division
4th Rifle Division (Poland)
4th Rifle Division (Soviet Union)
4th Siberian Rifle Division
4th NKVD Rifle Division